USS Spindrift (IX-49) was built in 1928 by F. F. Pendleton, Wiscasset, Maine. The auxiliary cutter was acquired by the United States Navy on 26 October 1941 and assigned to the Severn River Naval Command for duty with the United States Naval Academy.

Spindrift supported midshipman training at the academy until being placed in reserve in January 1947. She was struck from the Navy List on 22 December 1952.

References

External links
 Photo gallery at navsource.org

Unclassified miscellaneous vessels of the United States Navy
Ships built in Wiscasset, Maine
1928 ships
Individual yachts